Nashrud Kol (also Romanized as Nashrūd Kol and Nashrood Kal; also known as Nushrudkul) is a village in Sangar Rural District, Sangar District, Rasht County, Gilan Province, Iran. At the 2006 census, its population was 1,304, in 322 families.

References 

Populated places in Rasht County